Derby Time Online is a PlayStation 3 game developed and published in Japan by SCEI, which was only released in Japan. It is a horse racing simulator.

The multiplayer servers for the game went offline on June 3, 2009.

References 

2008 video games
Horse racing video games
Japan-exclusive video games
PlayStation 3 games
PlayStation 3-only games
Sony Interactive Entertainment games
Video games developed in Japan